The first season of The Great Australian Bake Off aired on the Nine Network and saw ten home bakers take part in a bake-off to test every aspect of their baking skills as they battled to be crowned The Great Australian Bake Off's best amateur baker.  Each week, saw keen bakers put through three challenges in a particular discipline. The season aired from 9 July 2013 till 27 August 2013, and saw Nancy Ho win.

The Bakers
{| class="wikitable sortable" style="text-align:center"
|-
! scope="col" style="background:skyblue; color:black;"| Baker
! scope="col" style="background:skyblue; color:black;"| Age
! scope="col" style="background:skyblue; color:black;"| Occupation
! scope="col" style="background:skyblue; color:black;"| Hometown
! scope="col" style="background:skyblue; color:black;"| Placement
|-
! scope="row"| Nancy Ho
| 22 || Architecture Graduate || Brisbane, Queensland || style="background:gold"| 
|-
! scope="row"| Jonathan Gurfinkel
| 35 || I.T. Guy || Melbourne, Victoria || style="background:limegreen"| 
|-
! scope="row"| Maria Vella
| 45 || Workplace Trainer || Melbourne, Victoria || style="background:limegreen"| 
|-
! scope="row"| Monique Bowley
| 30 || Former WNBL Star || Adelaide, South Australia || style="background:tomato"| 
|-
! scope="row"| Brendan Garlick
| 21 || Uni Student || Springwood, New South Wales || style="background:tomato"| 
|-
! scope="row"| Julie Bonanno
| 41 || Farm Mum || Shepparton, Victoria || style="background:tomato"| 
|-
! scope="row"| Mark Bartter
| 52 || Chartered Accountant || Sydney, New South Wales || style="background:tomato"| 
|-
! scope="row"| Sara-Jane Smith
| 30 || School Teacher || Melbourne, Victoria || style="background:tomato"| 
|-
! scope="row"| Bliss Nixon
| 23 || Trivia Host || Gold Coast, Queensland || style="background:tomato"| 
|-
! scope="row"| Steve Lovett
| 28 || Boxer || Canberra, Australian Capital Territory || style="background:tomato"| 
|}

Results summary

Colour key:

Episodes

Episode 1: Cakes
For the first challenge, the bakers were required to make 24 cupcakes in two hours. The judges specified they wanted two different flavours of cupcake of which there should be 12 each.  The Technical Challenge set was for a Checkerboard Cake, which was flavoured with chocolate and orange and had four layers. A Children's Party Cake was set as the Showstopper to be completed in five hours.

Episode 2: Pies
A family pie was set as the first challenge, with two and a half hours being set as the time limit. The bakers had any choice of filling - sweet or savoury - and pastry, the only brief was that the pie must have a lid. For the next challenge, a lemon meringue pie was set, with the judges hoping for a perfectly cooked pastry, a set filling and a crispy meringue. For the Showstopper Challenge, the judges wanted 12 Party Pies, 12 Sausage Rolls and 12 Pasties in four hours.

Episode 3: Biscuits
For the Signature bake, 24 Aussie Assortments - classic Australian biscuits - were required of the bakers. In two and a half hours, the bakers had to make two different types of biscuit, 12 of each. 12 Brandy Snaps were set as the Technical Challenge, with the judges requesting they be 12 cm in length, and that ten be filled with cream and two be left for snapping. For the final challenge, a gingerbread structure was set, to be done in four hours.

Episode 4: Tarts
A tarte tatin was set for the Signature Challenge, to be completed within two and a half hours. For the Technical Challenge, a Quiche Lorraine was set, which used rough puff pastry and was to be finished again within two and a half hours. For their final challenge, the bakers were tasked with creating 12 miniature sweet tarts - half fruit and half chocolate.

Episode 5: Bread
In the Signature Challenge, the bakers were asked to make a loaf which was free-form (i.e - not in a tin) in two and a half hours. For the Technical, the challenge was Dan's recipe for coffee scrolls, which were filled with cinnamon and sultanas and were topped with a coffee glaze. The bakers had two and a half hours. Finally, the bakers had to make a bread basket (which did not have to necessarily be edible) and 24 rolls of two flavours for the Showstopper in four hours.

Episode 6: Desserts
The bakers were first tasked with making one large baked cheesecake in two and a half hours, with the choice base (biscuit, pastry, etc.) and flavours being the baker's own.  For the Technical bake, a layered pavlova torte was set as the challenge to be completed in two and a half hours. Consisting of three layers of meringue filled with whipped cream and summer fruits, the bakers were also asked to make their own strawberry sugar art. The Showstopper Challenge was a tiered celebration cake with at least two tiers.

Episode 7: Pastry
For the first challenge, the bakers had to make a gluten-free fruit tart in two and a half hours which would serve eight people. For the next challenge, 6 croissants were set to be completed in four hours with jam of the baker's choice. A strudel was set as the Showstopper - it should be complete in two and a half hours, with the only criteria being it should be enough to feed eight people.

Episode 8: Finale
In the final Signature Challenge, the bakers had three and a half hours to make a large, multi-layered gâteau. In the Technical, choux pastry Religieuse were set. The bakers had to present three different flavours - chocolate, coffee and rose - and they had two and a half hours. Finally, the bakers had to make a selection of 36 petit-fours. The bakers were required to make three types - twelve of each.

Ratings

References

1
2013 Australian television seasons